SNFC may refer to:

South Normanton F.C.
Sunderland Nissan F.C.